Laceyella sacchari  is a bacterium from the genus of Laceyella which has been isolated from a bagasse in Thailand.

References

Further reading

External links
Type strain of Laceyella sacchari at BacDive -  the Bacterial Diversity Metadatabase	

Bacillales
Bacteria described in 1971